Operational Mentoring and Liaison Teams (OMLTs) were the NATO equivalent of the United States' Embedded Training Teams and were active in Afghanistan.

Countries
Teams from several countries 
provided training and operational support to the Afghan national forces.
France
Germany
Spain
Romania
United Kingdom
Australia
Netherlands
Belgium
Canada
Czech Republic
Croatia
Italy
Sweden
Latvia
Finland
Norway
Slovenia
Poland
Hungary
Bulgaria
Serbia  
North Macedonia

References

External links
  NATO OMLT factsheet
 Afghanistan, ISAF Operations led by NATO - Albanian Ministry of Defence 

Military units and formations of the War in Afghanistan (2001–2021)